Maximovo is a rural locality (a selo) and the administrative centre of Maximovsky Selsoviet, Yanaulsky District, Bashkortostan, Russia. The population was 590 as of 2010. There are 10 streets.

Geography 
Maximovo is located 27 km east of Yanaul (the district's administrative centre) by road. Zirka is the nearest rural locality.

References 

Rural localities in Yanaulsky District